Fillon is a French surname.

Geographical distribution
As of 2014, 87.7% of all known bearers of the surname Fillon were residents of France (frequency 1:13,873), 3.4% of Argentina (1:228,575), 3.2% of the United States (1:2,076,157) and 3.1% of the Philippines (1:599,032).

In France, the frequency of the surname was higher than national average (1:13,873) in the following regions:
 1. Centre-Val de Loire (1:4,489)
 2. Nouvelle-Aquitaine (1:6,248)
 3. Auvergne-Rhône-Alpes (1:6,802)
 4. Pays de la Loire (1:8,585)

People
 Jean Fillon, known as Jean de Venette, 14th century French Carmelite friar and author
 Benjamin Fillon (1819–1881), a French numismatist and archaeologist 
 François Fillon (born 1954), the 116th Prime Minister of France.
 Penelope Fillon, wife of François Fillon
 Jean-Luc Fillon, a French oboist

References

French-language surnames
Surnames of French origin